Live in Seattle is a live recording by Jay Farrar, along with Eric Heywood and Mark Spencer. The album was recorded at The Showbox in Seattle on 24 July 2003 and released by Transmit Sound Records in 2004.

Track listing
Make It Alright   
Feel Free   
California   
Barstow   
Gather   
Heart on the Ground   
No Rolling Back   
Damn Shame   
All of Your Might   
Cahokian   
Vitamins   
Feed Kill Chain   
Voodoo Candle   
Fool King's Crown   
White Freightliner Blues (Townes Van Zandt)

All songs written by Farrar except where noted.

References 

2004 live albums
Jay Farrar albums